Aese Island (also known as Aessi, Haiite Island) is a private uninhabited island in Sanma Province of Vanuatu in the Pacific Ocean.

Geography
Aese Island is located off the east coast of Espiritu Santo Island. The Perimeter of the Island is 18km.

Habitat
Highly dense trees cover the island. Beaches are 5 metres wide. Hundreds of coconut trees from bygone days provide the archetypal tropical backdrop. The west side of the island faces into the sheltered waters of the bay and there are hundreds of metres of sandy beaches and shallow coral. The East side of the island has ocean views and a coral reef.

Fish
Fish are common in the region and there are seasonal rotation of mahi-mahi, yellowfin tuna, dogtooth tuna, wahoo and marlin.

Other
In the past, the island was densely populated, and about 700 people lived there in 1906.

References

Islands of Vanuatu
Sanma Province
Uninhabited islands of Vanuatu